Alexander Goldwyer-Lewis (1849-1904) was Archdeacon of Bombay from 1890 until 1896.

Goldwyer-Lewis was educated at St David's College, Lampeter and ordained in 1873. After curacies in Erbistock and Oswestry  he served with the Bombay Ecclesiastical Establishment until his appointment as Archdeacon.

On his return from India he was the incumbent at Aldford then Davenham. He died on 4 January 1904.

References

1904 deaths
1849 births
Alumni of the University of Wales, Lampeter
Archdeacons of Bombay